The Cotton Company of Zimbabwe, is a large cotton processing and marketing organization in Southern Africa.  The company, known as "COTTCO", works with individual cotton farmers, providing agronomic and financial support.  Cottco is listed on the Zimbabwe Stock Exchange and its stock index, the Zimbabwe Industrial Index.  Its head offices are located in Harare. Cotton, export internationally via COTTCO, is one of the larger generators of foreign currency for Zimbabwe.

References

External links
The Cotton Company of Zimbabwe
COTTCO's stock data at LiquidAfrica

Companies listed on the Zimbabwe Stock Exchange
Agriculture companies of Zimbabwe
Cotton organizations
1994 establishments in Zimbabwe
Companies based in Harare